Ramón Eduardo David Mendieta Alfonso (born 4 May 1988) is a Paraguayan footballer. He currently plays as a midfielder for 12 de Octubre.

Career

Club career
Mendieta started his career in his homeland of Paraguay in which he played for Club Guaraní and Club 12 de Octubre. In June 2009, he signed for Portuguese club Vitória Guimarães for €150,000  in which the transfer will go through on 1 July 2009. In January 2010, he was loaned out until the end of the season to Portuguese Second Division side Gondomar.

References

External links

1986 births
Living people
Paraguayan footballers
Paraguayan expatriate footballers
Club Guaraní players
Vitória S.C. players
Gondomar S.C. players
12 de Octubre Football Club players
Club Sol de América footballers
Cerro Porteño players
Chiapas F.C. footballers
Atlante F.C. footballers
Independiente F.B.C. footballers
Sportivo Luqueño players
Ascenso MX players
Liga MX players
Paraguayan Primera División players
Association football midfielders
Expatriate footballers in Mexico
Expatriate footballers in Portugal
Paraguayan expatriate sportspeople in Portugal
Paraguayan expatriate sportspeople in Mexico